The 1988–89 Florida State Seminoles men's basketball team represented Florida State University in the program's final season as members of the Metro Conference during the 1988–89 NCAA Division I men's basketball season. Led by head coach Pat Kennedy, the Seminoles reached the NCAA tournament as the #4 seed in the Southeast region, but were upset in the first round by Middle Tennessee State. The team finished with an overall record of 22–8 (9–3 Metro).

Roster

Schedule

|-
!colspan=9 style=| Regular Season
|-

|-
!colspan=9 style=| Metro Conference Tournament
|-

|-
!colspan=9 style=| NCAA Tournament
|-

Rankings

NBA draft

References

Florida State Seminoles men's basketball seasons
1988 in sports in Florida
1989 in sports in Florida
Florida State
Florida State